Top Gun: Danger Zone is a video game developed by Distinctive Software and published by Konami in 1991 for DOS.

Plot
Danger Zone (Top Gun) is a flight simulator where the player has the opportunity to fly with training instructors, and is then able to compete against 12 classmates, while a split screen allows two players to fly simultaneously.

Reception
The game was reviewed in 1992 in Dragon #181 by Hartley, Patricia, and Kirk Lesser in "The Role of Computers" column. The reviewers gave the game 2 out of 5 stars.

Reviews
Joystick
Software Gids

References

External links
Top Gun: Danger Zone at MobyGames

1991 video games
Distinctive Software games
DOS games
DOS-only games
Konami games
Single-player video games
Top Gun video games
Video games based on films
Video games developed in Canada